"Oh Woman, Oh Why" is a song written by English musician Paul McCartney, first released on the Apple Records label in February 1971 as the B-side to McCartney's debut single as a solo artist, "Another Day".

Lyrics and music
The overall style of "Oh Woman, Oh Why" is that of a tense, blues rock song complemented by a fierce vocal delivery. In addition, the song is paced by a drum rhythm which establishes a solid foundation upon which tight guitar lines interweave. Beatle biographer John Blaney praised McCartney's "rip-roaring" vocal performance for its grit and rawness. Blaney also praises McCartney's "economical" bass line and Denny Seiwell's "thunderous" drumming. Blaney does criticize the lyrics for "questioning rather than celebrating womanhood," stating that in this context the aggressiveness of the vocal performance is "particularly notable."

Release
"Oh Woman, Oh Why" was listed with "Another Day" during the single's run on the Billboard Hot 100 chart in the United States. The record peaked at number 5 on the Hot 100 in April 1971. On the Cash Box Top 100 chart, which listed sides separately, "Oh Woman, Oh Why" peaked at number 55. The song has been praised for McCartney's impressive range of vocal pitch.

Subsequent releases
Although "Another Day" and "Oh Woman, Oh Why" were not originally released on any solo or Wings album, both songs appeared as bonus tracks on later editions of Paul and Linda McCartney's 1971 solo album, Ram. "Oh Woman, Oh Why" has also been included on the Special and Deluxe editions of the 2012 remasters of Ram. It was also included on The 7" Singles Box in 2022.

Personnel
Paul McCartney – vocals, bass, electric guitar, percussion, shaker, gun shots
Hugh McCracken – electric guitar
Denny Seiwell – drums, percussion, shaker
Linda McCartney – backing vocals

References

External links
 [ Allmusic review]

1971 singles
Apple Records singles
Blues rock songs
Music published by MPL Music Publishing
Paul McCartney songs
Song recordings produced by Paul McCartney
Songs written by Paul McCartney